Tony DeBlase (1942 - 2000) also known as Anthony DeBlase, was part of the BDSM and leather subcultures. He was the designer of the leather pride flag.

Leather and BDSM activities
In 1979, he founded DungeonMaster magazine (about sadomasochistic technique), which ran from 1979 until 1994. He also wrote for that magazine.

In 1982, under the pen name Fledermaus, he published a collection of fictional sadomasochism stories, titled The Fledermaus Anthology.

In 1986, the leather magazine Drummer was sold to DeBlase, who sold it in 1991 to Martijn Bakker, owner of RoB Amsterdam.

On May 28, 1989, DeBlase first presented the leather pride flag (which he had designed), at International Mister Leather.

Initial reaction to the flag was mixed. According to DeBlase's article A Leather Pride Flag,
"Some, particularly on the east coast, reacted positively to the concept, but were quite concerned, some even offended, that I had not involved the community in helping to create the design."

On September 18, 1990, Clive Platman (Mr. Australia Drummer) presented DeBlase with an Australian version of the flag, incorporating the southern cross, which is from the Australian national flag, with the original design of the leather pride flag.

In 1991, the Leather Archives & Museum (the LA&M)  was founded by DeBlase and Chuck Renslow, “as a community archives, library, and museum of Leather, kink, fetish, and BDSM history and culture.” DeBlase served as Vice President of the Board of Directors there from 1992 until 2000. He also began a Leather History Timeline, which was set up in the LA&M on the south wall of the main exhibit gallery. His papers (among other things) are held in the LA&M.

At International Mr. Leather 1999 DeBlase presented one of three original leather pride flags which he assembled as a prototype to the Leather Archives & Museum.

Awards
In 1987 DeBlase received NLA’s Man of the Year award. In 1990 he received the Business Person of the Year Award as part of the Pantheon of Leather Awards. He also received the Pantheon’s Lifetime Achievement Award in 1994, their Forebear Award in 1997, and their Community Choice (Man) Award in 2001. In 2010 he was inducted into the Leather Hall of Fame. In 2017 he was honored along with other notables, named on bronze bootprints, as part of San Francisco South of Market Leather History Alley. He was also knighted as a Chevalier at the Leather Coronation in San Francisco, and received the Caligula Award from the Chicago Hellfire Club, which he was a member of.

Career
DeBlase was a mammologist who specialized in bat biology. He co-wrote A Manual of Mammalogy: With Keys to Families of the World (1974) with Robert Eugene Martin.

Personal life
DeBlase died of liver failure in 2000. He was survived by his partner Andrew Charles.

References

1942 births
2000 deaths
20th-century American zoologists
American zoologists
BDSM writers
Leather subculture
Flag designers